John Bacon Curtis (October 10, 1827 – June 13, 1897) was an American businessman from Maine. He is credited as the inventor of chewing gum, as well as the first person to commercialize it using natural products and flavorings. He got the idea for making chewing gum after seeing loggers chew spruce resin. He started with this product and changed it a couple of years later to a flavored paraffin wax gum, which was more successful. He eventually built a factory in Maine that employed some 200 employees and produced several brands of chewing gum. He had become wealthy and by the time he died at the age of 70 in 1897 he was worth $ in  dollars.

Early life

Curtis, son of John Curtis and Mary Brown (Bacon) Curtis, was born in Hampden, Maine, on October 10, 1827. His siblings were Charles H. and Mary E. Curtis. He attended normal schools while growing up. He never graduated, but worked instead for the family as a teenager to earn a living. Curtis worked as a farmhand and a swamper clearing roads through the woods by removing underbrush and downed trees, blocking out the roads to prepare for their final construction. Initially, he earned a salary of $5 a month, later that was increased to $16 a month, and eventually he worked his way up to $24 a month.

Mid-life

While he worked, Curtis noticed loggers chewing spruce resin. He thought it could be a commercial product and went about gathering up spruce resin. He boiled it, skimmed it off, poured it, cooled it, rolled it, cut it up into small pieces, dusted the pieces with cornstarch and wrapped them individually. In 1848, Curtis sold two of these pieces for one penny (¢ in ) as a chewing gum. His family had moved to Bangor in 1848 and over a Franklin stove in the Curtis home, they cooked up their first batch. The labelled their product "State of Maine Pure Spruce Gum"; the name of their new firm became Curtis & Son. He went to every merchant over three days before he was able to sell his merchandise to a store. There was very little market for his unflavored gum product in 1848 and 1849. He then in 1850 became a traveling salesman with a sales wagon covering the New England states as his territory. He sold flavored paraffin gum, which was much more popular.

Curtis was ambitious and would often travel, before his competition, into the night to get to the next town first. In this way, he would have most of that town's business as the wholesale peddler and be their principal supplier. He made $6,000 in 1850. This was the first commercial production and sales of chewing gum. Eventually, Curtis advanced from being just a wholesaler to a commercial sales traveler and included the American Old West—areas west of Maine such as Pennsylvania, Ohio, Minnesota and Missouri—in his territory. He traveled on the Erie Canal and down the Mississippi and Ohio Rivers. He would extend credit for as much as a year. He was one of the first, if not the very first, commercial sales broker as a representative of an Eastern business marketing firm in the United States.  

Curtis's father tended to the making of the chewing gum product while Curtis traveled to sell it. His father had his men pick the gum from spruce trees. After collecting a sufficient amount of the raw product, they would bring it out of the woods to the Bangor factory for processing. The business did well and the fifteen square foot processing area became too small. They moved their chewing gum business to larger facilities in Portland, Maine. A few pounds of raw material were adequate in their first years of production; however, later they bought up to ten tons of spruce gum at a time. This was considered very risky. One day in the mid-1860s, Curtis purchased $35,000 worth of raw gum material in what was likely the largest transaction in that type of business in the nineteenth century.

In 1852, Curtis & Son expanded the business to occupy a factory that was  x  in area and three stories high. They employed 200 people, who turned out eighteen hundred boxes of chewing gum per day. Curtis invented most of the machinery used in the production process. He never took out a patent on any of his inventions. Instead, the firm kept their process to make chewing gum secret. Some of the spruce gums Curtis & Son made were called  "American Flag", "Yankee Pure Spruce", "White Mountain", "200 Lump Spruce", "Licorice Lulu", "Trunk Spruce", "Sugar Cream," "Four-in-Hand" and "Biggest and Best.

Later life
In 1872, Curtis went into the dredging business. He worked on jobs that ranged from $50,000 to $500,000. Curtis was successful at this business as well. He later opened a shipyard and built ten large ships. He also owned the controlling interest in the ferry between Portland and South Portland, Maine, and a line of steamers until 1896. Curtis was even in the silver and coal mining business in Maine. In 1880, Curtis was farming on a grand scale near Gothenburg, Nebraska. Here he owned over  where he raised 3,500 Hereford cattle and 1,200 hogs. One year he harvested 75,000 bushels of corn, 12,000 bushels of wheat, 9,500 bushels of rye, 8,000 bushels of oats and 2,000 bushels of barley.

Personal

Curtis married Alice Charlotte Bacon of Rockton, Illinois, there on August 13, 1878. That year, Curtis bought the largest and most expensive house in Deering Center, Maine. During the last months of his life, he took an interest in ancient Egypt and the pyramids. His creed was "do good." Curtis died at his home on June 13, 1897. In his will he bequeathed his $500,000 fortune to trustees to be invested and the income to be paid to his wife. After her death the residue went to personal bequests and several public institutions including $20,000 to the town of Bradford for the construction of a library. It was to be a free public library for the advancement of nonsectarian education. The library is named the John B. Curtis Free Public Library in his honor and is listed on the National Register of Historic Places. The buff brick and granite building at Bradford Corners was dedicated March 15, 1915.

References

Sources
 

1827 births
1897 deaths
19th-century American inventors
Businesspeople in confectionery
People from Hampden, Maine
Businesspeople from Portland, Maine
People from Bangor, Maine
Farmers from Nebraska